Infinitas Learning is a Dutch educational publishing company. It was formed from Bridgepoint Capital's purchase of the educational division of Wolters Kluwer.

Imprints
The company issues books under the following imprints (brands):

Current
Noordhoff Uitgevers (Netherlands)
Liber (Sweden)
Plantyn (Belgium)

Former
Nelson Thornes (UK): Sold 2013 to Oxford University Press
Bildungsverlag EINS (Germany): Sold 2013 to Westermann Verlagsgruppe
Digital Spirit (Germany): Sold 2014 to Idox plc
Jugend & Volk (Austria): Sold 2012 to Westermann Verlagsgruppe
Muszaki Kiadó (Hungary): Sold 2013 to local education publisher, Konsept-H
LJ Create (UK): Sold 2015 to Management

References

External links
Official website
Dutch newspaper De Telegraaf on failed divestment of Noordhoff Uitgevers in 2013

Book publishing companies of the Netherlands
Educational publishing companies